E-Life is the sixth studio album by the band Mint Condition issued in 2008 on Image Entertainment. The album reached No. 8 on the Billboard Top R&B/Hip-Hop Albums chart and No. 12 on the Billboard Top Independent Albums chart.

Overview
E-Life is Mint Condition's second album for the label Image Entertainment.

The first single released from E-Life was the song "Baby Boy, Baby Girl"- with an alternate version sent to radio featuring guest vocals from neo-soul singer Anthony Hamilton. The second single "Nothing Left to Say" featured a music video directed by fellow Minneapolis, Minnesota native and independent filmmaker Wayne H. Johnson, Jr. The music video was created by the faculty and students of Globe University/Minnesota School of Business. Members of the school's Music Business program, digital video and media production programs were primarily responsible for the making of the video.

The song "Why Do We Try" was later covered by Robert Glasper with Mint Condition frontman Stokley Williams on Glasper's 2012 album Black Radio.

Track listing

Personnel
Credits adapted from album's text.

 Stokley Williams - lead and background vocals, drums, drum programming, guitar, bass synth, moog, keyboards, harmonica, steel pan
 Ricky Kinchen - lead and background vocals, bass, keyboards, drum programming, acoustic guitar, photography
 Lawrence Waddell - keyboards, piano
 Jeffrey Allen - background vocals, saxophone
 Homer O'Dell - guitar, keyboards, drum programming
 Chris Dave - drums
 Phonte - rap, background vocals
 Alicia Marie - intro vocals
 Brandon Kinchen - intro vocals
 Ali Shaheed Muhammad - turntables
 Anna - trumpet
 Kat Higgins - background vocals
 Brian Johnson - mixing
 Herb Powers, Jr. - mastering

References

2008 albums
Mint Condition (band) albums
Image Entertainment albums